The Appy Awards, presented on 11 April 2011, marked successful and popular applications (generally known as "apps") for mobile devices. Sponsored by The Carphone Warehouse, Europe's largest independent mobile phone retailer, awards were presented in ten categories in a ceremony hosted by television presenters Richard Hammond and Amanda Byram.  According to the sponsors, it was "the UK's first major app awards ceremony designed to recognise innovation and development in app technology."  The company hoped to make it an annual event.

Carphone Warehouse staff nominated around 1,000 apps from which a panel of judges produced a shortlist of 50, announced by Hammond in February 2011. In an online process, about 30,000 votes were cast by the public to choose the winners. Most of the shortlisted apps are free to download but others require a one-off or an ongoing payment. Finland-based Rovio Mobile's 2009 game Angry Birds, which recently passed the 100-million download mark, won the award for Best App of the Year along with a win in the Best Game App category and a nomination in the Best Time Waster App category.  Lima Sky's Doodle Jump, which topped 10 million downloads in March 2011, was nominated in both the Best Game App and Best Time Waster App categories but failed to win either.  Similarly ShopSavvy Barcode Scanner and Football Manager Handheld 2011 were nominated in two categories, both failing to win an award.  As of 2016, no further Appy Awards have been made other than those in the inaugural ceremony.

Winners and shortlisted apps

See also

 List of computer-related awards

References

A
Awards established in 2011